Westridge High School is an independent, day school in Harare, Zimbabwe. It was founded in 1999 by the Hindoo Society, a registered welfare organization dating back to 1916.

Westridge High School is a member of the Association of Trust Schools (ATS) and the Headmaster is a member of the Conference of Heads of Independent Schools in Zimbabwe (CHISZ).

Overview
The school has approximately 300 students from Form One (Freshman) to Form 6 (Seniors). Westridge High School follows the traditional Zimbabwean-British system of education in which examinations are administered at both Ordinary Level, and at Advanced Subsidiary and A Level.

The founding headmaster is Mr N. Kala (1999 - 2006), then came Mr. R. Ramlaul (late), who was an expert in Geography.
Followed by Mr. D. Chouhan, a Mathematics expert. The current headmaster is Mr. J. Davies, a Physics expert.
Subjects include English, Math, Physics, Chemistry, Biology, Computer Science, Information and Communication Technology, Accounts, Business Studies, Economics, Geography, English Literature, History,  French, Shona, Music, Design and Textiles, Art and Design Technology. The school also has several sports and clubs. The sports the school offers include soccer, cricket, hockey, tennis, squash, badminton, table tennis, volleyball, swimming and netball. The clubs at the school are chess, wildlife, bridge, art and craft, floral design, debate, interact, computers, choir, junior achievers, science, zimun, golf, magazine and drama.
 
The most important club there is wildlife. It is held at the Eco park which the late Mr. R. Ramlaul made and cherished. In the Eco park there are different types of trees and a big pond full of fish. There are also a number of birds that are always there.

See also

 List of schools in Zimbabwe

References

External links
 
 Westridge High School Profile on the ATS website

Schools in Harare
High schools in Zimbabwe
Private schools in Zimbabwe
Cambridge schools in Zimbabwe
Co-educational schools in Zimbabwe
Day schools in Zimbabwe
Member schools of the Association of Trust Schools
1999 establishments in Zimbabwe
Educational institutions established in 1999